Kim A. Snyder is an American filmmaker and producer. Previously, she spent some time contributing to Variety.
 
Snyder made her directorial debut with the 2000 documentary, I Remember Me, a biographical film chronicling her struggles with Chronic Fatigue Syndrome (CFS). In 2016, Snyder won at the Crested Butte Film Festival ACTNow award for Newtown and was nominated at Sundance Film Festival in Grand Jury Prize-Documentary.
 
She currently resides in New York City.

Background 

Snyder received a bachelor's from George Washington University in 1983 and a master's in International Affairs from the Johns Hopkins School of Advanced International Studies in 1986.  Upon completion of her masters, Snyder worked in international trade. She became involved in filmmaking  as an international film consultant and U.S. Producer's Representative in Europe in the early 1990s.

She is an advocate for the use of film as a medium to promote social change. As a co-founder of the BeCause Foundation, which aims to better the lives of children, Snyder produced three short films—Alone No Love, One Bridge to the Next and Crossing Midnight—to raise awareness on issues of child sexual abuse, healthcare, homelessness and refugee integration. Previously, Snyder also served on the admissions committee for the Graduate Film Program at NYU's Tisch School of the Arts.

Early career 

Snyder credits curiosity for her start in filmmaking. Following some time representing films in Eastern Europe, she broke the production side of the indie film industry.

Snyder worked as an associate producer for the 1994 Oscar-winning short film Trevor, which tells the story of suicidal gay teenager. Trevor was later picked up by HBO, and Ellen DeGeneres hosted the airing. The directors of the film, Randy Stone and Peggy Rajski, realized the need for young people to have a safe way to discuss their feelings about sexuality, and thus in 1998 created the Trevor Lifeline (now the Trevor Project). The Trevor Lifeline became "the first national crisis intervention and suicide prevention lifeline for lesbian, gay, bisexual, transgender and questioning youth." Trevor won the 1995 Academy Award for Best Action Live Short.

In 2000, Snyder directed, produced, wrote and appeared in the film I Remember Me. The film became her biographical documentary debut, and explored the history of and controversy behind Chronic Fatigue Syndrome.

Shorts 

In 2008, Snyder expanded on her philanthropic efforts by working with the non-profit BeCause Foundation to direct and produce the short films Alone No Love, One Bridge to the Next and Crossing Midnight.

Alone No Love (2007) is a 27-minute film that addresses the issues Chicago doctors, state's attorneys, police officers and social workers face when working on cases involving sexually abuse children.

With a portion of America's homeless out of sight and out of mind for some, Snyder took the initiative to create her short One Bridge to the Next (2008). Most of the film narrows in on Operation Safety Net, an organization that delivers healthcare to the homeless from bridge ways to alleyways.

The last in the series of shorts Snyder directed and produced for the BeCause Foundation was Crossing Midnight (2009), which documents the struggles of Burmas refugees and those who come to their rescue.

Snyder directed and produced the short film Duke Riley Goes to China, which premiered at the Palm Springs International ShortFest in 2015. The film chronicles the journey of Brooklyn artist Duke Riley, who embarks on recreating the race of the 12 Chinese zodiac animals.

Career

Welcome to Shelbyville 

Welcome to Shelbyville (2011), another project done in cooperation with the BeCause Foundation, was selected as Gucci-Tribeca Documentary Fund grant recipient.  It aired on PBS' Independent Lens. Snyder's Welcome to Shelbyville documents the intersection of race and religion in America's Heartland.

Newtown 

Showing the people and lives most affected by the Sandy Hook elementary school shooting in 2012, Snyder's Newtown made its debut in the US Documentary Competition at the 2016 Sundance Film Festival. Filmed over three years, the film focuses on the devastated community of Newtown, Connecticut in the aftermath of tragedy.

On the film, IndieWire blogger Katie Walsh wrote: "This film is an important historical record, and an important reminder of an event in American history that could have changed everything, that should have changed everything. There's no reason why it still can't. "Newtown" is a crucial reminder of that."

Jordan Raup of The Film Stage commented: "Each conversation, whether it be with families of those who lost children or the first responders at Sandy Hook Elementary School, is attuned to their internal grappling with the unfathomable loss.

Newtown won a Peabody Award, was nominated for the Sundance Grand July Prize in Documentary and for Best Documentary at the Cleveland International Film Festival.

Lessons from a School Shooting: Notes from Dunblane 

Following the Newtown documentary, Snyder set out to direct a follow up piece: Lessons from a School Shooting: Notes from Dunblane, which premiered at the 2018 Tribeca Film Festival.

Nominations and awards

Nominations 
Cleveland International Film Festival, Best Documentary, Newtown (2016)
Sundance Film Festival, Grand Jury Prize-Documentary, Newtown (2016)
Critics Choice Award, Best Political Documentary, "Newtown" (2016)

Awards
 Tribeca Film Festival, Best Documentary Short, Lessons from a School Shooting: Notes from Dunblane (2018)
 Peabody Award, Best Documentary, Newtown (2017)
 Crested Butte Film Festival, ACTNow Award, Newtown (2016)
 Denver Film Festival, Best Documentary Film/Video, I Remember Me (2000)
 Hamptons Film Festival, Honorable Mention, I Remember Me
 Sarasota Film Festival, First Runner Up, I Remember Me
 Taos Film Festival, Land Grant Finalist
 Aspen Shortsfest, Audience Award, One Bridge to the Next (2008)

Filmography

Director 
I Remember Me (2000)
Alone No Love (2007)
One Bridge to the Next (2008)
Crossing Midnight (2009)
Independent Lens (2011)
Welcome to Shelbyville (2011)
Duke Riley Goes to China (2015)
Newtown (2016)
Lessons from a School Shooting: Notes from Dunblane (2018)
Us Kids (2020)

Producer 
Trevor (1994)
I Remember Me (2000)
Alone No Love (2007)
One Bridge to the Next (2008)
Crossing Midnight (2009)
Independent Lens (2011)
Welcome to Shelbyville (2011)
Duke Riley Goes to China (2015)
Newtown (2016)
Lessons from a School Shooting: Notes from Dunblane (2018)
Us Kids (2019)

References

Living people
George Washington University alumni
Paul H. Nitze School of Advanced International Studies alumni
American documentary film producers
Year of birth missing (living people)
American documentary film directors
American women documentary filmmakers